The arrondissement of Abbeville is an arrondissement in the Somme department in the Hauts-de-France region of France. It has 164 communes.

Composition

The communes of the arrondissement of Abbeville are:

 Abbeville (80001)
 Acheux-en-Vimeu (80004)
 Agenvillers (80006)
 Aigneville (80008)
 Ailly-le-Haut-Clocher (80009)
 Allenay (80018)
 Allery (80019)
 Argoules (80025)
 Arrest (80029)
 Arry (80030)
 Ault (80039)
 Bailleul (80051)
 Beauchamps (80063)
 Béhen (80076)
 Bellancourt (80078)
 Bernay-en-Ponthieu (80087)
 Béthencourt-sur-Mer (80096)
 Bettencourt-Rivière (80099)
 Biencourt (80104)
 Le Boisle (80109)
 Boismont (80110)
 Boufflers (80118)
 Bouillancourt-en-Séry (80120)
 Bourseville (80124)
 Bouttencourt (80126)
 Bouvaincourt-sur-Bresle (80127)
 Brailly-Cornehotte (80133)
 Bray-lès-Mareuil (80135)
 Brucamps (80145)
 Brutelles (80146)
 Buigny-l'Abbé (80147)
 Buigny-lès-Gamaches (80148)
 Buigny-Saint-Maclou (80149)
 Bussus-Bussuel (80155)
 Cahon (80161)
 Cambron (80163)
 Canchy (80167)
 Caours (80171)
 Cayeux-sur-Mer (80182)
 Chépy (80190)
 Citerne (80196)
 Cocquerel (80200)
 Condé-Folie (80205)
 Coulonvillers (80215)
 Cramont (80221)
 Crécy-en-Ponthieu (80222)
 Le Crotoy (80228)
 Dargnies (80235)
 Dominois (80244)
 Dompierre-sur-Authie (80248)
 Domqueur (80249)
 Domvast (80250)
 Doudelainville (80251)
 Drucat (80260)
 Eaucourt-sur-Somme (80262)
 Embreville (80265)
 Épagne-Épagnette (80268)
 Ercourt (80280)
 Ergnies (80281)
 Érondelle (80282)
 Estrébœuf (80287)
 Estrées-lès-Crécy (80290)
 Favières (80303)
 Feuquières-en-Vimeu (80308)
 Fontaine-sur-Maye (80327)
 Fontaine-sur-Somme (80328)
 Forest-l'Abbaye (80331)
 Forest-Montiers (80332)
 Fort-Mahon-Plage (80333)
 Francières (80344)
 Franleu (80345)
 Fressenneville (80360)
 Frettemeule (80362)
 Friaucourt (80364)
 Friville-Escarbotin (80368)
 Froyelles (80371)
 Frucourt (80372)
 Gamaches (80373)
 Gapennes (80374)
 Gorenflos (80380)
 Grand-Laviers (80385)
 Grébault-Mesnil (80388)
 Gueschart (80396)
 Hallencourt (80406)
 Hautvillers-Ouville (80422)
 Huchenneville (80444)
 Huppy (80446)
 Lamotte-Buleux (80462)
 Lanchères (80464)
 Liercourt (80476)
 Ligescourt (80477)
 Limeux (80482)
 Long (80486)
 Longpré-les-Corps-Saints (80488)
 Machiel (80496)
 Machy (80497)
 Maisnières (80500)
 Maison-Ponthieu (80501)
 Maison-Roland (80502)
 Mareuil-Caubert (80512)
 Martainneville (80518)
 Méneslies (80527)
 Mérélessart (80529)
 Mers-les-Bains (80533)
 Mesnil-Domqueur (80537)
 Miannay (80546)
 Millencourt-en-Ponthieu (80548)
 Mons-Boubert (80556)
 Mouflers (80574)
 Moyenneville (80578)
 Nampont (80580)
 Neufmoulin (80588)
 Neuilly-le-Dien (80589)
 Neuilly-l'Hôpital (80590)
 Nibas (80597)
 Nouvion (80598)
 Noyelles-en-Chaussée (80599)
 Noyelles-sur-Mer (80600)
 Ochancourt (80603)
 Oneux (80609)
 Oust-Marest (80613)
 Pendé (80618)
 Ponches-Estruval (80631)
 Ponthoile (80633)
 Pont-Remy (80635)
 Port-le-Grand (80637)
 Quend (80649)
 Quesnoy-le-Montant (80654)
 Ramburelles (80662)
 Regnière-Écluse (80665)
 Rue (80688)
 Saigneville (80691)
 Sailly-Flibeaucourt (80692)
 Saint-Blimont (80700)
 Saint-Maxent (80710)
 Saint-Quentin-en-Tourmont (80713)
 Saint-Quentin-la-Motte-Croix-au-Bailly (80714)
 Saint-Riquier (80716)
 Saint-Valery-sur-Somme (80721)
 Sorel-en-Vimeu (80736)
 Tilloy-Floriville (80760)
 Le Titre (80763)
 Tœufles (80764)
 Tours-en-Vimeu (80765)
 Tully (80770)
 Valines (80775)
 Vauchelles-les-Quesnoy (80779)
 Vaudricourt (80780)
 Vaux-Marquenneville (80783)
 Vercourt (80787)
 Villers-sous-Ailly (80804)
 Villers-sur-Authie (80806)
 Vironchaux (80808)
 Vismes (80809)
 Vitz-sur-Authie (80810)
 Vron (80815)
 Wiry-au-Mont (80825)
 Woignarue (80826)
 Woincourt (80827)
 Yaucourt-Bussus (80830)
 Yonval (80836)
 Yvrench (80832)
 Yvrencheux (80833)
 Yzengremer (80834)

History

The arrondissement of Abbeville was created in 1800. In January 2009 the canton of Oisemont passed from the arrondissement of Amiens to the arrondissement of Abbeville. At the January 2017 reorganisation of the arrondissements of Somme, it received two communes from the arrondissement of Amiens, and it lost 38 communes to the arrondissement of Amiens.

As a result of the reorganisation of the cantons of France which came into effect in 2015, the borders of the cantons are no longer related to the borders of the arrondissements. The cantons of the arrondissement of Abbeville were, as of January 2015:

 Abbeville-Nord
 Abbeville-Sud
 Ailly-le-Haut-Clocher
 Ault
 Crécy-en-Ponthieu
 Friville-Escarbotin
 Gamaches
 Hallencourt
 Moyenneville
 Nouvion
 Oisemont
 Rue
 Saint-Valery-sur-Somme

References

Abbeville
Abbeville